Senator Irons may refer to:

Paulette Irons (born 1952), Louisiana State Senate
Tammy Irons (born 1963), Alabama State Senate